Mannings is a personal care product chain owned by Dairy Farm International Holdings, which is in turn owned by Jardine Matheson. It is known as Guardian for Malaysia, Indonesia, Brunei, Vietnam, and Singapore. By the end of 2016, there were 1715 stores in Asia, 355 in Hong Kong, 17 in Macau, 228 in Mainland China,  425 in Malaysia, 245 in Indonesia, 23 in Brunei, 47 in Vietnam, 126 in Singapore, 5 in Cambodia, and 246 in the Philippines. The total income of Mannings in 2017 was US$2.8 billion. Its major rivals include Watsons which is owned by CK Hutchison Holdings.

With more than 350 outlets, Mannings is Hong Kong's largest health and beauty product chain store providing health care, personal care, skin care and baby products.

References

DFI Retail Group
Pharmacies of China
Retail companies of China
Retail companies of Malaysia
Retail companies of Singapore
Retail companies of Hong Kong
Hong Kong brands
Pharmacy brands